Edward Aloysius Rumely (1882–1964) was a physician, educator, and newspaper man from Indiana.

Education 

Rumely was born in La Porte, Indiana, in 1882. He attended University of Notre Dame, Oxford University and the University of Heidelberg. He graduated from the University of Freiburg, where he received his M.D. in 1906.

Interlaken School 

It is said that while he studied in Germany, he lived on nuts, herbs and other uncooked foods and wore sandals and scanty clothes, under the influence of views espoused by Leo Tolstoy. But he came back with every appearance of normality and founded the Interlaken School at La Porte, the school where boys did all their own work, from carpentry up.

Rumely married one of the teachers at Interlaken in 1910, Fanny Scott. The Interlaken School closed in 1918 due to anti-German sentiments associated with World War I. Isamu Noguchi was one of the last students to enroll at Interlaken before it closed.

Family business 

While running the school, Rumely was also active in the family tractor business. He used his technological interest to develop the Rumely Oil Pull Farm Tractor, which burned kerosene. The Rumely family lost control of their own company due to Edward's mishandling of the company’s assets. The Rumely Hotel was built in 1913 in La Porte when Edward was still in charge of the family business.→Advance-Rumely

Publishing 

When the First World War broke out in Europe, Rumely was pro-German and outraged by the pro-British slant of most American newspapers. Thus, in 1915, Rumely bought and became editor-in-chief and publisher of the New York Evening Mail. Since he was a good friend of Theodore Roosevelt, he permitted him to use the newspaper as his mouthpiece. Roosevelt contributed one, and possibly many more, editorials on the subject of the development of the American merchant marine. Two other critics who wrote articles for the paper were Samuel Sidney McClure and H. L. Mencken.

Rumely's ownership caused him to be part of three major court cases, mostly due to perjury. In July 1918 Rumely was arrested and convicted of violation of the Trading with the Enemy Act. To get financing for the purchase of the newspaper Rumely was accused of receiving financing from the German government, which Rumely denied, claiming, instead, he had received money to buy the paper from an American citizen in Germany. He had failed to report this when he received the money.  President Coolidge granted him a presidential pardon in 1925.

Political activism 

From 1926 to 1930 Rumely assisted farmers in obtaining loans through the Agricultural Bond and Credit Company. This began his life's work of educating the public on monetary reform, farm credits in agriculture, and the value of the Constitution. Rumely believed that deflation was destabilizing American agriculture, and that monetary reform was necessary.	

To this end, in 1932 he formed and served as executive secretary of the Committee for the Nation for Rebuilding Purchasing Power and Prices. This committee sought to lower the gold content of the dollar by fifty percent and, thus, raise commodity prices. This program relied on Populist notions of how money and prices worked and was disputed by most orthodox economists. Franklin Roosevelt followed through on this and took the U.S. off of the gold standard adopted the Agricultural Adjustment Act to support farm prices.

Rumely and most members of the Committee for the Nation (as it was soon called) turned against Roosevelt's New Deal policies that they considered anti-business. When Roosevelt proposed to increase the number of justices on the Supreme Court many Committee members joined together to oppose the plan in the National Committee to Uphold Constitutional Government in 1937. Rumely still served as executive secretary of this newly renamed and reformed committee.

Rumely was not done yet, in 1941, he helped establish the Committee for Constitutional Government (CCG), serving as a trustee and executive secretary. In a mass mailing, the group distributed books and copies of the U.S. Constitution. In a break with Roosevelt over Roosevelt's attempt to increase the size of the Supreme Court, due to the Court's opposition to some of Roosevelt's proposed reforms, Rumely coined the phrase the "court packing plan" and used the CCG to lobby against the increase. Buchanan's House Select Committee on Lobbying Activities requested the names of those who received the book, believing that a tax evasion movement was involved. Rumely refused to comply, citing the First Amendment, and was convicted. In the landmark decision of United States v. Rumely, 345 U.S. 41, the Supreme Court upheld a reversal of conviction made by the U.S. Court of Appeals for the District of Columbia.

Retirement 

Rumely returned to La Porte in 1959 due to ill health. He spent his remaining years promoting cancer education and helped to spread the word on the effectiveness of the Pap smear test.

Edward A. Rumely died in 1964.

Bibliography 

The Gravest Days; Editorials Reprinted from The Evening Mail of New York City. New York, NY: New York Evening Mail, 1916. Copyright Edward A. Rumely, 1916. 
CONTENTS: Causes of the war—Issues of International Law—The Submarine Issue—The British Blockade.—The Freedom of the Seas—Mail Seizures—The British Black List—Ship Seizures—Red Cross—Humanity and Atrocity—Greece—Poland—The war in the West—The War in the East—The Italian Front—In the Balkans—The Dardanelles—The War in Asia Minor—The Naval War—Finances of the Belligerents—Conditions in Allied Countries—Conditions in Central Powers—Conditions in Neutral Countries—Peace—Nationalism and Internationalism—Mexico—Japan—Our Foreign Trade—Trade War, After the War—Merchant Marine—A Protective Tariff—American Preparedness—Army—The Garrison Plan—Universal Service—The Navy—Industrial Preparedness in General—Manufacturing Preparedness—Transportation Preparedness—Our Finances—Americanism—Political Issues, Autumn, 1916.

See also

 Merwin K. Hart of the National Economic Council, Inc.
 Joseph P. Kamp of the Constitutional Educational League

References

External link

1964 deaths
20th-century American educators
1882 births
People from La Porte, Indiana
Old Right (United States)
Educators from Indiana